Hendersonville may refer to:

Places

United States
Hendersonville, Mississippi, an early settlement (extinct town) in Yalobusha County, Mississippi
Hendersonville, North Carolina, a town south-east of Asheville
Hendersonville, Pennsylvania, a suburb of Pittsburgh
Hendersonville, South Carolina, an unincorporated community
Hendersonville, Tennessee, a suburb of Nashville
Hendersonville, Virginia, a defunct town